Eupithecia interpunctaria is a moth in the family Geometridae. It is found in Russia, Japan and Taiwan.

References

Moths described in 1979
interpunctaria
Moths of Asia